Los Grandes is a compilation album released by Marco Antonio Solís and Joan Sebastian on April 2, 2002

Track listing

Chart position

References

2002 compilation albums
Joan Sebastian compilation albums
Marco Antonio Solís compilation albums
Fonovisa Records compilation albums